Ashraful Islam may refer to:
 Ashraful Islam (army officer), Bangladeshi general
 Ashraful Islam (field hockey), Bangladeshi field hockey player
 Ashraful Islam (politician), Bangladeshi politician

See also 
 Ashraful Islam Rana (born 1988), Bangladeshi association football player